Trichispa is a monotypic genus of beetles belonging to the family Chrysomelidae. The only species is Trichispa sericea.

The species is found in Southern Africa.

References

Cassidinae
Chrysomelidae genera
Monotypic beetle genera